Pineview Dam is located in Ogden Canyon,  east of Ogden, Utah, United States.

Description
Pineview Dam is located at the eastern end of Ogden Canyon at the confluence of the north, south, and center forks of the Ogden River. The western half of present-day Huntsville is located between the central and southern bays of Pineview Reservoir. State Route 158 crosses the dam and runs adjacent on the north and west, former State Route 166 on the north and east, and State Route 39 on the southeast and south.

The dam was developed as a means of providing reliable irrigation to  located between the Wasatch Range and the Great Salt Lake. It was built as part of the Ogden River Project, which included the Pineview Dam and Reservoir, Ogden Canyon Conduit, Ogden-Brigham Canal, South Ogden Highline Canal, and a gravity-pressure distribution located in the South Ogden Conservation District. Its shape is similar to that of an airliner or a bird.

History
Increasing diversions lead to a shortfall of irrigation flow during the late summer months. The Geological Survey 1921 established stream gauging stations along the river. A storage reservoir recommendation was made shortly after that by the Bureau of Reclamation, and investigations continued until 1932. The Pineview site was then adopted for a  reservoir.

President Roosevelt authorized the Ogden River Project on November 16, 1935. Fund allotment had begun in 1933 under the National Industrial Recovery Act.  Construction began on September 29, 1934. Completion of the Pineview dam and Ogden-Brigham Canal occurred in June 1937.  The South Ogden Highline Canal was constructed between 1938-1941.

Its construction is a zone earthfill dam type containing  of earth, rock and riprap materials.

A stillout is fed from the same conduit through a  outlet. A wye adapter on the  conduit allows additional discharge into the stillout, while  conduit feeds the Ogden City filtration plant located downstream. At  down the Ogden River Canyon, the Ogden River Conduit splits into the Ogden-Brigham and South Ogden Highline canals.

Benefits
At present capacity, the Pineview Reservoir is capable of irrigating  of land. This greatly improved irrigation capacity and distribution, allowing for the growth of all manner of crops.

The reservoir also acts as a recreational area located very close to Ogden and the nearby areas. Camping, boating, water-skiing and personal watercraft use, as well as trout, bass, crappie and wall-eyed pike fishing are popular activities in the recreational area. Nearly one million people visited the area in 1996.

Flood control has been estimated at nearly ten million dollars between the years of 1950 and 1999.

This project was completed in 1991, and diverts water from the  conduit, returning it after use.

Pineview Reservoir is one of only three lakes in Utah that house the tiger muskie, a sterile hybrid fish. These fish have a torpedo shaped body, with vertical "tiger" striping on the sides. They also have many sharp canine like teeth.

References

External links

 U.S. Bureau of Reclamation (Pineview Dam)
 U.S. Bureau of Reclamation (Ogden River Project)
 

Dams in Utah
Buildings and structures in Weber County, Utah
Wasatch Range
United States Bureau of Reclamation dams
Dams completed in 1937
Historic American Engineering Record in Utah